Ms. Kim's Million Dollar Quest is a South Korean television series directed by Lee Min-cheol, Jang Ki-hong, Jin Seok-gyu and starring Kim Hyun-joo, Ji Jin-hee, Kim Sung-ryung, Park Gun-hyung. It premiered on SBS on April 7, 2004 to May 27, 2004 and airs every Wednesday and Thursday at 21:55 KST.

Synopsis 
In the right of her wedding day, Kim Eun-jae (Kim Hyun-joo) was canceled by the groom of Yoo Young-Hoon. Her wedding photographer Park Moo-yeol (Ji Jin-hee), is a rich hand, who helped Eun Jae avoid humiliating by pretending to be her husband. Soon the family of Moo Yeol was bankrupt. The family's house will be sold if Moo-yeol cannot have money quickly. Meanwhile, Eun-jae believed that if she became rich, Young-hoon would return to her. Hence, Eun-Jae and Moo-Yeol decided to cooperate. They moved to stay together and planned to make money together. Unfortunately, making money is not as easy as they planned. However, both began to realize that even though they could be unlucky about money, they were very lucky in love

Cast 

 Main

 Kim Hyun-joo - Kim Eun-jae
 Ji Jin-hee - Park Mu-yeol
 Kim Sung-ryung - Suh Woo-kyung
 Park Gun-hyung - Yoo Young-hoon

Supporting

 Shin Goo - Kim Hee-taek
 Yeo Woon-kay - Lee Kkeut-sun
 Bong Tae-gyu - Bong-kyu
 Sung Ji-ru - Jo Min-ho
 Jo Eun-sook - Han Ji-hee
 Hong Soo-hyun - Lee Jin
 Park Sun-woo - Bae Sang-in
 Park Won-sook - Mu-yeol's mother

Awards

References 

Seoul Broadcasting System television dramas
2004 South Korean television series debuts
2004 South Korean television series endings
Korean-language television shows
South Korean melodrama television series
South Korean romance television series